Tree Dzhamal (translit. Derevo Dzhamal) is a 1981 Soviet drama film directed by Khodzhakuli Narliyev. It was entered into the 12th Moscow International Film Festival where Maya-Gozel Aimedova won the award for Best Actress.

Cast
 Maya-Gozel Aimedova
 Baba Annanov
 Nikolay Smorchkov
 Khommat Mullyk
 Mukhamed Cherkezov
 Mered Atakhanov
 Khudaiberdy Niyazov
 Khodzha Kuli Narliyev
 Samira Redzhepova
 Gulshat Durdyyeva
 Yelena Zabrovskaya

References

External links
 

1981 films
1981 drama films
Soviet drama films
1980s Russian-language films
Soviet-era Turkmenistan films
Films directed by Khodzha Kuli Narliyev